Spring Garden Industrial Area is a neighborhood in south Baltimore, Maryland.

References

Neighborhoods in Baltimore
South Baltimore